Gore District Council is the territorial authority for the Gore District of New Zealand.

The council is led by the mayor of Gore, who is currently . There are also eight ward councillors and three councillors elected at large.

Composition

Councillors

 Mayor 
 Gore ward: Bronwyn Reid, Bret Highsted, Nick Grant, Glenys Dickson, Doug Grant
 Mataura ward: Neville Phillips
 Waikaka ward: John Gardyne
 Waimumu-Kaiwera ward: Stewart MacDonell
 Councillors elected at-large: Cliff Bolger, Nicky Davis, Richard McPhail

Community boards

 Mataura Community Board: Alan Taylor, Greg Chaffey, Linda Sinclair, Susan Taylor, Steve Dixon

History

The council was established in 1989, directly replacing the Gore and Mataura Borough Councils  and part of Southland County Council  (established in 1885.) as the Gore District, New Zealand 

In 2020, the council had 334 staff, including 28 earning more than $100,000. According to the Taxpayers' Union think tank, residential rates averaged $2,163.

References

External links

 Official website

Gore District, New Zealand
Politics of Southland, New Zealand
Territorial authorities of New Zealand